Charles William Perkins (4 October 1855 - 2 August 1927) was Birmingham City Organist from 1888 to 1923.

Life
He was born in 1855 the son of Robert A Perkins, jeweller, and Hannah.

He studied organ under Andrew Deakin, organist of the Church of the Saviour in Edward Street, Birmingham and studied piano under Dr. Charles Swinnerton Heap.

He spent his early years in London where he was also a conductor of the Epsom Choral Society. In November 1887 he wrote from his home at 5 Redburn Street, Tedworth Square, London to apply for the post of organist at Sydney Town Hall but withdrew when he was appointed Birmingham City Organist early the next year.

In 1894 Théodore Salomé dedicated the first of his Douze pièces nouvelles pour orgue, vol. 1, op. 59 to Perkins.

In 1890 he married Mabel Norah Stone (1873 - 1943) and they had the following children:
Ruth Lynette Perkins (1892 - 1970)
Cecil Howard Perkins (1896 - 1918)
Henry Trovell Perkins (1898 - 1966)

For the greater part of his life he lived at 2 Piers Road, Handsworth, Birmingham.

He died on 2 August 1927 in Bickley, Kent.

Career
Honorary organist of the New Jerusalem Church, Summer Lane, Birmingham 1873 - 1875
Organist of Wretham Road Church, Handsworth ca. 1881 - 1884
Assistant pupil, Westminster Abbey 1884 
Organist of Immanuel Church, Streatham Common 1884 - 1885
Organist of St Michael and all Angels’ Church, Paddington 1885 - 1888
Birmingham City Organist 1888 - 1923
Organist of Carrs Lane Church, Birmingham 1915 - 1920

References

1855 births
1927 deaths
British classical organists
British male organists
Musicians from Birmingham, West Midlands
Male classical organists